This list encompasses castles described in German as Burg (castle), Festung (fort/fortress), Schloss (manor house) and Palais/Palast (palace). Many German castles after the middle ages were mainly built as royal or ducal palaces rather than as a fortified building.

List of castles in the Free Hanseatic City of Bremen 
 Castle Schönebeck, Vegesack
 Wätjens Castle, Bremen-Blumenthal

See also
List of castles
List of castles in Germany

 
Castles
Bremen